Boonie Bears: The Wild Life is a 2021 Chinese animated fantasy comedy film, and the seventh feature film in the Boonie Bears series. Originally planned for a 25 January 2020 release, it was delayed by the COVID-19 outbreak and ultimately released in mainland China on 12 February 2021 (Chinese New Year). In the film, a park named "Wild Land" opens near Pine Tree Mountain, where Vick participates in a transformation contest with Bramble and a mysterious man named Leon. When guests who have been transformed into animals ferociously attack on people, Vick, Leon and the two bears bravely respond to the crisis. The film received mixed to positive reviews.

Plot 
Vick, a tourist guide, is thrilled upon learning about the park named 'Wild Life' from his former classmate. The park's concept uses gene-altering bracelets to transform humans to an animal of your choice upon, as well as a super-transforming version. Contestants then compete with a range of other groups through an elimination round and a finals round. The winner group then receives one million dollars. With the belief that this price will be the solution to his problems, Vick and his former classmate and 'friend', but was deceived by him departing for a better group. However, Vick's bear friend Bramble also secretly entered the park, and they teamed up together with a stranger named Leon.

During the first round, the team struggled to earn their spot at the finals, but succeeded in a down-to-the wire contest. Nevertheless, the team secured the spot and that the 'Wild Life' was originally conceived by Tom and Leon, the latter of which inventing most technologies and constructed the park to bring happiness due to that his deceased daughter Lily was thrilled by his invention. As a result, Leon entered attempting to shut the park since that the super-transforming technology is unsafe and results in savage animal states. Hence, those animal states, along with Bramble's brother Briar, were captured. However, Leon was captured by Tom after the contest, who fallaciously debated that the technology is safe. Subsequently, Leon, Vick, Briar and Bramble escaped from Tom and successfully shut down the place through closing Leon's artificial unintelligence, who believed that the primitive state drives happiness and uses this to deceive staff of the park.

Cast 

The theme song "I Will Always Be Here" is sung by Lala Hsu.

Production 
According to the filmmakers, animating the Wild Land contest venue was an extremely complex process that required 3,000 machines to render simultaneously every day. In one three-minute sequence in particular, the average time for a machine to render a frame was 20 hours – equivalent to 120 machines rendering for 30 days, 24 hours a day.

Boonie Bears: The Wild Life is the first Chinese animated film in which humans transform into other animals. According to Daisy Shang, president of Fantawild Animation, this required a "special rigging system" to animate realistically.

The producers stated that film is focused on the theme of happiness. It explores the essence of happiness and how happiness influences human behavior. The directors expressed hope that both children and adults watching the movie would think about the question of what happiness is. They hoped the film would make audiences think about their lives and their futures.

Release 
The film was scheduled for a 25 January (Chinese New Year) 2020 release, but was delayed by the COVID-19 outbreak. It was subsequently screened at the 2020 Shanghai International Film Festival.

It was released on 12 February (Chinese New Year) 2021 in mainland China. Internationally, the film released on 12 February 2021 in Japan, 19 February 2021 in Australia, and 7 May 2021 in Canada. And also released on Netflix on 4 December 2020.

On its first day, the film earned 101 million RMB (US$15.6 million) at the box office. Its three-day gross was 236 million RMB (US$36.5 million), making it the fourth highest grossing film of the 2021 Chinese New Year weekend.

Reception
The film received mixed to generally positive reviews, with a score of 6.3 out of 10 on Douban and 8.8 out of 10 on Maoyan as of January 2022. Reviewers praised it for its family entertainment value, but criticised the familiarity and its usage of ideas from other established films such as Zootopia. It was also nominated for a Golden Rooster Award for Best Animation at the 2020 Golden Rooster Awards.

References 

2021 animated films
Chinese animated films
Boonie Bears films
Films about genetic engineering
Films about shapeshifting
Films postponed due to the COVID-19 pandemic